Jesus Freaks International is a German evangelical Christian youth organization. The movement uses the Alpha and Omega symbol to represent Jesus Christ.

History 
The Jesus Freaks movement was created in September 1991 in Hamburg, Germany by Martin Dreyer.

Criticism
Critics cite the movement as leaning towards conservative fundamentalism, and having the appearance of a closed society with a high level of peer pressure internally. However, they point out that they provide ministry to drug abusers, the homeless, and others often marginalized by the mainstream church.

Duane Pederson, who became one of the primary voices in the US Jesus Movement of the 1970s, see parallels between that movement and the new German one. Specifically, both movements were created from grass roots.

References

External links
 

Christian youth organizations
Youth organisations based in Germany